Aushbali  is a village in Chanditala I community development block of Srirampore subdivision in Hooghly district in the Indian state of West Bengal.

Geography
Aushbali is located at: .

Gram panchayat
Villages and census towns in Masat gram panchayat are: Aushbali, Azabnagar, Banamalipur, Chhunche, Krishnanagar and Masat.

Demographics
As per 2011 Census of India, Aushbali had a total population of 2,246 of which 1,140 (51%) were males and 1,106 (49%) were females. Population below 6 years was 250. The total number of literates in Aushbali was 1,525 (76.40% of the population over 6 years).

Transport

Railway
Baruipara railway station, its nearest railway station, is on the Howrah-Bardhaman chord line and is a part of the Kolkata Suburban Railway system.

Road
The main road is SH 15 (Ahilyabai Holkar Road). It is the main artery of the village and it is connected to NH 19 (old numbering NH 2)/ Durgapur Expressway.

Bus

Private Bus
 26 Bonhooghly - Champadanga
 26A Serampore - Aushbali

Bus Routes without Numbers
 Howrah Station - Bandar (Dhanyaghori)

References 

Villages in Chanditala I CD Block